Corkscrew with Bayerncurve is a type of roller coaster that was manufactured by Vekoma. It was an adaptation of a similar corkscrew coaster designed by Arrow Development. The first model, Tornado, debuted in 1979 at Walibi Belgium. It was also the first roller coaster in mainland Europe to feature inversions.

Intended ride experience
The ride starts with a slow ascent of 75 ft (22m). Once it reaches the top, the car goes around a turn and down a 68 ft drop reaching 44 mph. The train then pulls through a camel hump and a 180 degree turn before entering two Corkscrew inversions. Once the train exits the two inversions, it then travels around a 180 degree turn and into some trim brakes (In the latter years, the brakes weren't needed as much). After that, the train drives across another camel hump and into the Bayerncurve, a helix-type maneuver, and around the perimeter of the coaster again, before going into the brakes and station.

Installations

Vekoma